The Men's 4 x 100 metres relay athletics events for the 2016 Summer Paralympics took place at the Estádio Olímpico João Havelange between 12 and 15 September 2016. A total of two events was contested over this distance, with the T11-T13 event being open to three different disability classifications for visually impaired athletes and the T42-47 event open to six classifications for athletes with limb deficiencies.

Schedule

Medal summary

Results

T11-13

T42-47

References

Athletics at the 2016 Summer Paralympics
Men's athletics competitions
Running in Brazil
2016 in men's athletics